The Ministry of Public Health (MSP) is the ministry of the Government of Uruguay responsible for establishing public health policies and strategies, in order to contribute to the improvement of the health of the inhabitants of the Nation.  

The ministry's mission is to establish policies and strategies for the fulfillment of essential public health functions, as well as to guide the functioning of the National Integrated Health System (SNIS). The Ministry is headquartered in the 18 de Julio Avenue in Barrio Cordón, Montevideo. This government portfolio is in charge of the National Institute for Donation and Transplantation of Cells, Tissues and Organs. The current Minister of Public Health is Karina Rando, who has held the position since March 13, 2023.

History 
The Ministry of Public Health was created on September 5, 1933 by president Gabriel Terra. Law 9,202 "Organic Law of Public Health" was enacted on January 12, 1934 and merged the two public institutions existing up to that time: "National Hygiene Council" and "National Public Assistance".

Since the approval of law 18161 of July 29, 2007, in which the State Health Services Administration (ASSE) is created, the ministry ceases to have direct competence over the country's health centers.

List of Ministers of Public Health 

¹ Ministers  of the Military-Civic government (1973-1985).

See also 

 Health in Uruguay

References 

Health in Uruguay
Ministries established in 1933
1933 establishments in Uruguay